Tunstallia may refer to:

 Tunstallia (fungus), a genus in the family Sydowiellaceae.
 Tunstallia (gastropod), an extinct species of Lophospiridae.